Newstead Priory was a priory in Lincolnshire, England, between Stamford and Uffington.

It was founded as a hospital towards the end of the 12th century, and became a house of Augustinian Canons in or before 1226. Newstead Priory was situated on the River Gwash about halfway between Stamford and Uffington and near to the water mill.

Burials
William d'Aubigny (rebel)

References

Monasteries in Lincolnshire
Augustinian monasteries in England